The 1925 Notre Dame Fighting Irish football team was an American football team that represented the University of Notre Dame as an independent during the 1925 college football season. In its eighth season under head coach Knute Rockne, the team compiled a 7–2–1 record and outscored opponents by a total of 200 to 64.

Three Notre Dame players were recognized on Billy Evans' "National Honor Roll": tackle Stonewall McMannon; guard John "Clipper" Smith; and halfback Christie Flanagan. In addition, fullback Rex Enright received third-team honors on Walter Eckersall's 1925 All-America team.

Schedule

References

Notre Dame
Notre Dame Fighting Irish football seasons
Notre Dame Fighting Irish football